Cyamops nebulosus is a species of fly in the family Periscelididae.

References

nebulosus
Articles created by Qbugbot
Insects described in 1913